Pilu Momtaz ( – 23 May 2011) was a Bangladeshi singer.

Background and career
Momtaz was born in Dhaka. She was the third of seven children born to the Bangladeshi singer Ustad Momtaz Ali. She launched her career in the years immediately following Bangladesh's independence in 1971. Her songs included "Ekdin Tho Choley Jabo", "Chara Gaachh-e Phool Phuitachhey", and "Majhi Nao Chhaira Dey," a song written by Bangladeshi songwriter and poet, Jasimuddin.

Her final public performance took place at the 2010 Citycell-Channel i Music Awards. Momtaz took the stage at the awards show with Fakir Alamgir and Ferdous Wahid to perform the song, "Ek Second-er Nai Bhorosha," as a tribute to the late singer, Firoz Shai.

Personal life and death
Momtaz was married to Lieutenant Colonel Anwaruzzaman. Together they had a daughter, Homayra Zaman Mou. Momtaz died from a heart attack at Apollo Hospital in Dhaka on 23 May 2011, at the age of 52.

References

1950s births
2011 deaths
People from Dhaka
Bangladeshi folk singers
20th-century Bangladeshi women singers
20th-century Bangladeshi singers
Year of birth missing
21st-century Bangladeshi women singers
21st-century Bangladeshi singers